sometimes abbreviated as  is a Japanese fantasy, romantic comedy manga series written and illustrated by Kentaro Yabuki. It was serialized in publisher Shueisha's Weekly Shōnen Jump magazine from June 2020 to April 2022, and has been transferred to the Shōnen Jump+ website since April 2022, with its individual chapters collected and published by Shueisha into thirteen tankōbon volumes as of March 2023. The manga has been licensed for English release in North America by Seven Seas Entertainment, and Shueisha also simultaneously publishes the series in English and Spanish for free on the Manga Plus app and website. An anime television series adaptation by Connect premiered in January 2023.

Ayakashi Triangle focuses on exorcist ninja Matsuri Kazamaki, as he tries to defend his childhood friend, the Ayakashi Medium Suzu Kanade, from evil spirits called ayakashi. However, during a battle to save Suzu's life, Matsuri is turned into a girl after being cursed by Shirogane, the King of Ayakashi. With no apparent way to reverse the transformation, Matsuri is forced to live publicly as a girl in the foreseeable future as he and Suzu deal with both the friendly and the malicious ayakashi they encounter as well as their growing romantic feelings for each other, all while trying to break Matsuri's curse for him to return to his original masculine form.

Synopsis

Setting
The story of Ayakashi Triangle takes place in the fictional  located in the countryside of Japan. Unbeknownst to its citizens, Omiko is also populated by  spirits that are invisible to most people. The few individuals able to see ayakashi are those who possess a large amount of at least one of the two energies that humans are composed of:  the life energy, and  the spiritual energy. An example of such is the  a rare type of human who over-secretes haku, the energy from which ayakashi are entirely made of; for this reason, the Ayakashi Medium is worshiped by the majority of ayakashi as a deity-like figure.

Although ayakashi in general are amicable and pacific towards humans, there are malicious and wicked ayakashi that endanger their lives. To counter the threat they pose as well as to protect the public from dangerous ayakashi, exist clans that consist entirely of exorcist ninja whose strengthened kon allows them to perform jutsu and other extraordinary feats. These clans work directly under the Exorcist Ninja Association a secret organization founded by the government of Japan hundreds of years prior to the start of the series. The Association supplies local agents across the country with knowledge about ayakashi, training to combat them, and special equipment; this last one is provided by tool shops that also doubles as regular stores for the wider community.

Premise
Matsuri Kazamaki and Suzu Kanade are childhood friends who share the ability to see ayakashi. While Matsuri is descendant of a line of exorcist ninja who protect people from evil ayakashi, Suzu is an Ayakashi Medium whose power draws many ayakashi to her. However, Matsuri learns Suzu's growing power will inevitably bring ayakashi to try to devour her to get more power, so he decides to protect Suzu by exorcising the evil ayakashi that approach her. Years later, on the day before the pair were to start high school, Suzu is attacked by Shirogane, the  but is saved by Matsuri. Unable to beat him, Matsuri seals away most of his powers into a scroll, but before he does, Shirogane puts a curse on Matsuri that turns him into a girl, hoping the transformation will ruin any chance he and Suzu have of becoming a couple in the future. As Suzu helps Matsuri to adjust to his new life as a girl, Shirogane plots to regain his power and devour Suzu.

Production

Concept and creation
In 2019, mangaka Kentaro Yabuki published the one-shot manga  in the 11th issue of Weekly Shōnen Jump on February 9, as part of the magazine's "J Romcom Festival!" for Valentine's Day celebrations. This one-shot would later be used by Yabuki as a source of inspiration for him to create Ayakashi Triangle, with the manga featuring a premise similar to that of Reo × Leo, although there was no ayakashi in the one-shot, a significant difference that would only be shown in the manga. Reo × Leo focused on a normal high school student named  and her childhood friend  a martial artist boy who is magically gender-swapped into a girl by his father; Yabuki reused the characteristics of both characters, including their personalities and designs, to conceive the main protagonists of Ayakashi Triangle, Matsuri Kazamaki and Suzu Kanade.

In May 2021, Yabuki commented that when he created the primary setting of Ayakashi Triangle, Omiko City, he modeled the designs of the scenario after an unspecified area near Odawara, located in Kanagawa Prefecture.

Development
In Ayakashi Triangle, one of the most outstanding elements present in its plot is the constant display of female nudity (male nudity is also seen, but rarely in comparison to female), as in the 37th chapter of the manga, in which Suzu is initially seen taking a shower and spends the entire chapter naked, with special focus dedicated to her body. Other elements observed are the use of panty shots (panchira), revealing or sexualized clothing, groping, and other representative cases of sexual overtones that can be considered as ecchi or as qualifiers for anything related to erotic and simply content. In digitally released chapters, the intimate parts of the female characters' bodies, such as the vagina and nipples, are censored. However, the printed volumes of the manga show the latter exposed and in detail.

The previously mentioned elements of Ayakashi Triangle are commonly associated with Yabuki's works, especially his earlier manga series Black Cat (2000–2004), To Love Ru (2006–2009), and the latter's continuation To Love Ru Darkness (2010–2017); the first series was created solely by Yabuki, while the last two manga were only illustrated by him, with writer Saki Hasemi as co-creator of the To Love Ru franchise alongside Yabuki. Unlike To Love Ru, the sexual content seen in Ayakashi Triangle is less explicit and prominent than its own, due to the fan service not being one of the main focuses of the manga as it was in To Love Ru, although the graphic and sexual intensity of many scenes in Ayakashi Triangle is still higher when compared to other manga series. Furthermore, the occasional cameo appearances of To Love Ru characters in Ayakashi Triangle confirm that the two series are not only canonical to each other but also coexist in the same fictional universe. For instance, the character Run Elise Jewelria (who has the ability to gender-swap identical to Matsuri) makes a brief appearance in the 4th chapter of Ayakashi Triangle, and Kyouko Kirisaki is indirectly alluded to in the 8th chapter of the manga.

Cultural references
Ayakashi Triangle is notable for focusing on legendary creatures that are notable in Japanese folklore and mythology, with the aforementioned ayakashi as the central point of the series. In legends, ayakashi are yōkai that appear above the surface of some body of water, whereas in the manga, ayakashi is the collective name to refer to the variety of spirits that inhabit the world, in addition to having subspecies such as the tsukumogami, a type of ayakashi that take over inanimate objects. A secondary focus in Ayakashi Triangle is Japanese culture. An exemplification of this is how some of the manga's drawings pay homage to the classic style of Japanese art. Another case worthy of observation is that Matsuri is constantly seen wearing a fundoshi (in both his male and female forms), which is a traditional Japanese undergarment for adult men.

Up until the 35th chapter of Ayakashi Triangle, the manga had a predominant emphasis on mythological figures from Japanese folklore. As of the 36th chapter, the series started to address supernatural beings from other cultures, with the character Rochka being the first non-Japanese creature seen in Ayakashi Triangle. Rochka, whose name is an abbreviation for Snegurochka, is generally depicted in Russian fairy tales as the embodiment of winter and the granddaughter of Ded Moroz. Described as a "magical Russian loli", she is believed to be the Russian equivalent of Yuki-onna, yōkai that appear as beautiful women in icy, snowy or mountainous regions.

Themes and analysis
The series' main theme is about sexual orientation, and how the romantic attraction that one person feels for another is unrelated to their sex or gender. In Ayakashi Triangle, this is addressed mainly in the interactions between Matsuri and Suzu; the latter's behavior in the manga strongly reflects that of someone who is uncertain of their sexual preferences, as Suzu constantly questions herself in several chapters of the series if it is acceptable for her to pursue a relationship with Matsuri, regardless of whether or not they are of the same sex. Also, Matsuri is forced to examine his romantic interest for the same sex, a situation analogous to that of a person who suddenly realizes that they have feelings for someone of the same gender. The above theme coincides with Yabuki's statement in July 2020 that he plans to include various "relationship triangles" in the manga that go beyond just romance.

Publication
Ayakashi Triangle, written and illustrated by Kentaro Yabuki, started in Shueisha's shōnen manga magazine Weekly Shōnen Jump on June 15, 2020. The series finished in the magazine on April 18, 2022, and was transferred to the Shōnen Jump+ website starting on April 25 of the same year. Shueisha has collected its chapters into individual tankōbon volumes. The first volume was released on October 2, 2020. As of March 3, 2023, thirteen volumes have been released.

Ayakashi Triangle has been licensed for simultaneous publication in North America as it is released in Japan, with its chapters being digitally launched by Viz Media on its Shonen Jump website. Shueisha also simultaneously publishes the series translated into both English and Spanish languages for free on the Manga Plus app and website. In January 2022, both Manga Plus and Viz Media's Shonen Jump revealed that they would not publish the series' 74th and 75th chapters. Viz Media retired the book volumes for purchase from their website. In March 2022, Seven Seas Entertainment announced that they had licensed the manga and will release it in uncut print and digital formats.

Volume list

Chapters not yet in tankōbon format
These chapters have yet to be published in a tankōbon volume.

Media

Vomic
A vomic (voice comic) adaptation of Ayakashi Triangle started to be released on November 20, 2020, with episodes uploaded to Jump Comics' official YouTube channel. The vomic shows the manga images appearing on screen as voice actors, music and sound effects are heard. It stars both Hiromu Mineta and Yūki Kyōka as Matsuri Kazamaki (Mineta voices the character in his male form and Kyōka voices his female form), Saya Aizawa as Suzu Kanade, and both Mitsuteru Nagato and Hikaru Fujikura as Shirogane (Nagato voices Shirogane in his standard cat form while Fujikura voices his ayakashi form), among other voice actors.

Anime
On December 18, 2021, during Jump Festa 2022, an anime television series adaptation was announced. The series is produced by Connect and directed by Noriaki Akitaya, with assistant direction by Kei Umabiki, scripts written by Shogo Yasukawa, character designs handled by Hideki Furukawa, and music composed by Rei Ishizuka. It premiered on January 10, 2023, on GYT and other networks. Philosophy no Dance performed the opening theme song , while MIMiNARI performed the ending theme song  featuring Miyu Tomita and Kana Ichinose. Crunchyroll licensed the series. 

On January 23, it was announced that the series would be on a hiatus following the airing of episode 5 due to production delays caused by the COVID-19 pandemic. On February 27, it was announced that episodes 5 and 6 would air on March 6 and 13 respectively, but stated that it will announce details for episode 7 and beyond at a future date.

Episode list

Reception

Popularity
Ever since the debut of Ayakashi Triangle, the term  which stands for Transsexual Yuri, has become a popular trend on Twitter in response to the series' primary romance involving exclusively female characters.

Sales
In Japan, the first volume of Ayakashi Triangle debuted in 10th place on the daily Shoseki rankings with more than 23,350 copies sold on October 2, 2020. It subsequently dropped to 20th and then to 35th on October 4. As of October 13, Ayakashi Triangle sold more than 33,000 copies, surpassing the sales for the volumes of both Mashle: Magic and Muscles and Undead Unluck.

Critical response
Reviewing the first two chapters of Ayakashi Triangle, Shawn Hacaga of The Fandom Post called the story "decent" but "nothing special". Apart from strongly praising Yabuki's art as "gorgeous" and "fantastic", Hacaga also said it was fun nonetheless and admitted to being surprised by the gender-swap at the end of the first chapter. Reviewing for UT Daily Beacon, Connor Holt gave the manga a rating of 3 out of 5, saying that Ayakashi Triangle is average when viewed as an ecchi manga, but fails when viewed as a romantic comedy. Holt also commented on how he prefers for the manga to continue in this direction and that it helps to differentiate Ayakashi Triangle from other series in Weekly Shōnen Jump. In another review, Holt complimented on how Yabuki has managed a perfect balancing act between the manga's love triangle narrative, battle elements and ecchi overtones, saying it "gives readers an actual reason to read this manga and enjoy it as it comes into its own".

Jacob Parker-Dalton of OTAQUEST praised Yabuki's art style, in addition to comparing Ayakashi Triangle with Akihisa Ikeda's Rosario + Vampire: "dumb, horny, but definitely crafted with care and attention". Dalton also expressed his opinion on how Ayakashi Triangle looks like the first installment of a manga from the mid 2000s, since the series, according to him, "reuses several elements typical of that period: demons and yōkai, for one, but also shameless objectification, gender bending, and even a cute animal mascot". In a later review, Dalton emphasized the "quality" writing of Ayakashi Triangle, comparing it to Hirohiko Araki's JoJo's Bizarre Adventure by stating that "one of the series' latest chapters, in particular, was well written enough to warrant a comparison". In a third review for Ayakashi Triangle, Dalton positively remarked on the development of the series' plot as a "well-constructed story with plenty of emotional moments", and how the manga is "quickly proving to be far more competent than it initially appeared to be".

Thomas Daniell of AllYourAnime.Net commended Ayakashi Triangle as "clearly the work of a long established mangaka and not some newbie", but still criticized the developments of the manga as being "predictable", and noted that while Matsuri's gender-swap at the end of the first chapter was a "fun twist", it is a cliché widely used in anime and manga. Regarding the characters, Daniell said that, albeit they are not original, Yabuki's focus on them allows the details of the manga to "drip in a bit more naturally". Daniell also highlighted the series' use of fan service, and felt that, although it is used in part for comedic effect, its main purpose is to draw audience. Matthew Newman of Beneath the Tangles wrote, "The whole idea of ninja exorcists already had me interested. The first chapter is really packed full and, while there are some ecchi moments, overall it's a lot of fun. The series is rated above Teen, so you'd need to read it on the Shonen Jump website and not their app. But so far, I think it's worth checking out."

Accolades
In the 3rd edition of the Brazilian  award in 2021, Ayakashi Triangle was nominated for the Best Manga category.

See also
 Japanese folktales

Notes

Explanatory notes

Notes on Japanese

References
  "Ch." is a shortened form for chapter of the Ayakashi Triangle manga.

External links
 Ayakashi Triangle on the Official Shueisha website 
 Ayakashi Triangle on Manga Plus
 Ayakashi Triangle on the Official Viz website
 Ayakashi Triangle on the Official anime website
 

2020 manga
2023 anime television series debuts
Anime postponed due to the COVID-19 pandemic
Anime series based on manga
Aniplex
Connect (studio)
Crunchyroll anime
Exorcism in anime and manga
Fantasy anime and manga
Fiction about shapeshifting
Ninja in anime and manga
Romantic comedy anime and manga
Seven Seas Entertainment titles
Shōnen manga
Shueisha manga
Transgender in anime and manga
Viz Media manga